Micropterix italica is a species of moth belonging to the family Micropterigidae. It was described by Heath in 1981. It is known from Italy.

Gallery

References

External links
lepiforum.de

Micropterigidae
Moths described in 1981
Endemic fauna of Italy
Moths of Europe